Abū ʾUmāma or Suday ibn `Ajlan ibn Wahb or Abu Umama al-Bahili (Arabic أبو أمامة البَاهليّ‎ 81AH/86AH, 700CE, Homs, Syria) was a companion (sahabah) of Muhammad. 

Belonging to the Banū Bāhila tribe, member of the Qays ʿAylān, he fought alongside ʿAlī ibn Abī Ṭālib in the Battle of Siffin, and later settled in Syria.

Nearly 250 hadiths refers to him in the Sahih al-Bukhari and Sahih Muslim 

He was the last of the Ṣaḥāba to die in Syria.

References

7th-century births
700 deaths
Bahila
Sahabah hadith narrators